The MS Jubilee (also known as Pacific Sun and Henna) was a cruise ship that was originally built for Carnival Cruise Line. She was the second out of three ships to be built for Carnival's  of cruise ships. She was last owned by the Chinese company HNA Cruise Company, Limited around the West Pacific region. The ship is no longer in service and was scrapped in 2017.

History

Carnival Cruise Line

Jubilee was built in 1986 by Kockums Varv, Malmö, Sweden, for Carnival Cruise Line, along with near-sister ship Celebration. The other near-sister ship of the class, Holiday, was built earlier by Aalborg Værft in Aalborg, Denmark.

For many years, Jubilee sailed from Long Beach to the Mexican Riviera, including Ensenada, Puerto Vallarta, Cabo San Lucas and Mazatlan. In 1989, she started sailing Vancouver to Alaska and Hawaii, and in later years from Miami to the Caribbean  and Panama Canal cruises between Miami and San Diego. Her final homeport was Jacksonville, Florida. The last passenger sailing with Carnival took place on August 26, 2004 with a 4-day cruise to Nassau and Freeport, Bahamas.

P&O Cruises

In 2004, the vessel was transferred from Carnival to P&O Cruises Australia and renamed Pacific Sun. Pacific Sun arrived in Australia in 9 November 2004, and began year-round cruises from Sydney to the South Pacific and Tropical North Queensland. From late 2007, she was based at Brisbane, and was then the largest year-round liner to be based in Queensland. After receiving a multimillion-dollar makeover, she sailed in all white colours, like P&O's other ships, along with new amenities. Carnival's first new build ship, the slightly older Tropicale (Now MS Ocean Dream), also had her Carnival funnel removed, and replaced with Costa Cruises's round stove-pipe funnel, which she still retained until the end of her career.In late July 2008, 42 passengers were injured in a storm. The event became widely known when video footage was reposted on the internet two years later.

On 18 December 2011, P&O announced that Pacific Sun would leave its fleet in July 2012. Her farewell cruise was an 8-day roundtrip from Portside Wharf in Brisbane, Australia, and stopping at Nouméa, Lifou in New Caledonia, and Port Vila in Vanuatu with three days at sea. Pacific Sun had completed between 314 and 332 cruises, with 2,707 nights at sea and an estimated 586,000 passengers carried.

HNA Cruises
The ship was sold to Chinese interests under the newly formed cruise line, HNA Cruises. On 13 September 2012, the ship was renamed Henna. The ship made her maiden voyage under Chinese ownership on 26 January 2013 from Sanya to Vietnam.  At its time, the ship was the first and largest luxury cruise liner in mainland China at over 47,000 tons with 739 passenger cabins and a maximum passenger capacity of 1,965. Which included nine suites with balconies, 432 ocean-view staterooms and 298 interior staterooms. During its operation with HNA Cruises, the ship sailed to locations in Vietnam and in South Korea.

In September 2013 the ship was detained at a port on the South Korean island of Jeju after Chinese shipping service company Jiangsu Shagang International applied for a seizure. After several days stuck on board, the 1,659 passengers were flown home via HNA Group's China Hainan Airlines, leaving their cruise uncompleted but safe.

In November 2015, HNA shut down its cruise ship operation after three years of losing money due to newer vessels being deployed to the region. Since the Hennas last cruise with HNA, she was laid up and was placed for sale for $35 million USD.

Demise
With there being no interested buyers, Henna was sold for scrapping in Alang, India, it was photographed at the ship breaking yard in Alang as the Hen, ready to be scrapped on 1 May 2017. By late June, scrapping of the Hen began. By late August, half of the vessel has been scrapped. Scrapping of the vessel was finished by late 2017.

See also
 List of cruise ships

References

External links

 Henna page at HNA Tourism Cruise and Yacht Management
 Pacific Sun historical page at P&O Cruises (mirror)
 Professional photographs from shipspotting.com

Ships of P&O Cruises Australia
Ships built in Malmö
1985 ships
Jubilee
Jubilee
Carnival Cruise Lines